"Oochy Woochy" is a song by Graham Coxon from his second solo album The Golden D. In late 2000, the song was released as his debut solo single and as a promo single in the United Kingdom with another album track, "That's When I Reach for My Revolver," serving as the B-side.

The song is of a jazz fusion nature, but specific points in the song resemble shoegazing. The song is notable for suddenly "starting" roughly 30 seconds into the song, after a tranquil intro. It is also quite noteworthy for sounding "out of place" on its home album The Golden D.

Track listing
Promotional single 10" 10RDJ6541
"Oochy Woochy" - 4:24
"That's When I Reach for My Revolver" - 3:58

External links
Official Graham Coxon website
EIL.com listing

2000 debut singles
2000 songs
Songs written by Graham Coxon
Graham Coxon songs